George of Bavaria referred to as the Rich (15 August 1455 in Burghausen, Bavaria – 1 December 1503 in Ingolstadt), (German: Georg, Herzog von Bayern-Landshut) was the last Duke of Bavaria-Landshut. He was a son of Louis IX the Rich and Amalia of Saxony.

Biography
Together with his cousin Albert IV of Bavaria-Munich George tried to extend his influence in
Further Austria, but in 1489 he abandoned these plans to settle the difference with Frederick III, Holy Roman Emperor.
George later became a strong ally of Emperor Maximilian I and supported his campaigns in Swabia, Switzerland, Geldern and Hungary.

His wedding with the princess Hedwig Jagiellon, a daughter of King Casimir IV of Poland, in 1475 was celebrated in the Landshut Wedding with one of the most splendid festivals of the Middle Ages. The couple had five children, three sons and two daughters.  However, none of their sons survived until George's death, and per the restrictions of the Salic law practiced in medieval Germany, their daughters could not inherit the duchy.  However, George tried to bequeath the duchy to his daughter Elizabeth and her husband Ruprecht of the Palatinate, third son of Philip, Elector Palatine.  This led to a destructive war of succession after George's death in 1503–1504.
Finally he was succeeded by Albert IV of Bavaria-Munich. Only the new duchy of Palatinate-Neuburg passed to Ruprecht's sons Otto-Henry, Elector Palatine (Ottheinrich) and Philip.  The most southern districts of Bavaria-Landshut Kufstein, Kitzbühel and Rattenberg passed to Emperor Maximilian and were united with Tyrol.

Issue 
George and Hedwig had the following children:
Ludwig of Bavaria (1476–1496)
Rupert of Bavaria (1477)
Elisabeth of Bavaria (1478–1504), married Ruprecht of the Palatinate and was mother of Otto Henry, Elector Palatine.
Margaret of Bavaria (1480–1531)
Wolfgang of Bavaria (*/† 1482)

Ancestors 

1455 births
1503 deaths
15th-century dukes of Bavaria
16th-century dukes of Bavaria
People from Burghausen, Altötting
House of Wittelsbach